Clupeosoma laniferalis is a moth in the family Crambidae. It was described by George Hampson in 1907. It is found in Papua New Guinea, where it has been recorded from the Louisiade Archipelago.

References

Moths described in 1907
Odontiinae